Chris Markoff is a Yugoslav-American retired professional wrestler. He is best known for his appearances with professional wrestling promotions in the Midwestern United States in the 1960s.

Early life
Markoff was born in Yugoslavia and raised in Minneapolis, Minnesota in the United States.

Professional wrestling career
Markoff began his career in the Minneapolis-based American Wrestling Association in the mid-1960s. Managed by Professor Steve Druk, he feuded with The Crusher. He became AWA World Tag Team Champion with Harley Race in January 1967 after Race's original partner, Larry Hennig, sustained a broken leg. Their reign ended in November 1967 when they were defeated by Pat O'Connor and Wilbur Snyder.

In the mid-1960s, Markoff began wrestling for the Indianapolis, Indiana-based World Wrestling Association, where he formed a tag team with Angelo Poffo called "The Devil's Duo". Markoff and Poffo won the WWA World Tag Team Championship in 1966 and again in 1967.

In the late-1960s, Markoff began competing for Championship Wrestling from Florida. He won the NWA Florida Tag Team Championship in 1969 and again in 1972.

In 1969, Markoff wrestled for the Los Angeles, California-based promotion NWA Hollywood Wrestling. Over the course of the year, he won the NWA Americas Tag Team Championship with Bronko Lubich, the NWA "Beat the Champ" Television Championship, and the NWA Pacific Coast Heavyweight Championship (Los Angeles version) three times.

In 1972, Markoff toured Japan with the Japan Wrestling Association, wrestling a series of matches against Apache Bull Ramos. Antagonism between Markoff and Ramos resulted in a legitimate brawl in a restaurant during which Ramos bit off part of Markoff's ear and Markoff bit off the tip of Ramos' finger.

In 1978, Markoff wrestled in New Zealand for All Star Pro Wrestling, briefly holding the NWA British Empire/Commonwealth Championship. In the same year, he wrestled in Hawaii for 50th State Big Time Wrestling, holding the NWA Hawaii Tag Team Championship with Steve Strong.

In 1981, Markoff joined the Charlotte, North Carolina-based Jim Crockett Promotions, where he formed a tag team with Nikolai Volkoff called "The Imperial Russians". Managed by Lord Alfred Hayes, the duo won the NWA Mid-Atlantic Tag Team Championship later that year.

Championships and accomplishments
50th State Big Time Wrestling
NWA Hawaii Tag Team Championship (1 time) – with Steve Strong
American Wrestling Association
AWA World Tag Team Championship (1 time) – with Harley Race
Championship Wrestling from Florida
NWA Florida Tag Team Championship (2 times) – with Bronko Lubich (1 time) and Bobby Shane (1 time)
Jim Crockett Promotions
NWA Mid-Atlantic Tag Team Championship (1 time) – with Nikolai Volkoff
NWA Big Time Wrestling
NWA American Tag Team Championship (1 time) – with Bronko Lubich
NWA Brass Knuckles Championship (1 time)
NWA Detroit
NWA World Tag Team Championship (1 time) – with Dominic DeNucci
NWA Hollywood Wrestling
NWA Americas Tag Team Championship (1 time) – with Bronko Lubich
 NWA "Beat the Champ" Television Championship (1 time)
 NWA Pacific Coast Heavyweight Championship (Los Angeles version) (3 times)
NWA New Zealand
NWA British Empire/Commonwealth Championship (New Zealand version) (1 time)
World Wrestling Association
WWA World Tag Team Championship (2 times) – with Angelo Poffo

References

External links
 

1940 births
20th-century professional wrestlers
American male professional wrestlers
Faux Russian professional wrestlers
Living people
Professional wrestlers from Minnesota
The Heenan Family members
Yugoslav emigrants to the United States
Yugoslav professional wrestlers
NWA Florida Tag Team Champions
NWA "Beat the Champ" Television Champions
NWA Americas Tag Team Champions